McGivney may refer to:

McGivney, New Brunswick, a settlement in New Brunswick
21576 McGivney, a main-belt asteroid

People with the surname
Michael J. McGivney (1852–1890), Roman Catholic priest and founder of the Knights of Columbus